Adrian Jones may refer to:

 Adrian Jones (sculptor) (1845–1938), English sculptor and painter
 Adrian Jones (cricketer) (born 1961), English former cricketer
 Adrian Jones (American football) (born 1981), American football offensive guard
 Adrian Jones (musician) (born 1978), Swedish musician, member of Gjallarhorn (band)